Since the early 1900s the theory that Polynesians (who became the Māori) were the first ethnic group to settle in New Zealand (first proposed by Captain James Cook) has been dominant among archaeologists and anthropologists. Before that time and until the 1920s, however, a small group of prominent anthropologists proposed that the Moriori people of the Chatham Islands represented a pre-Māori group of people from Melanesia, who once lived across all of New Zealand and were replaced by the Māori. While this idea lost favour among academics, it was widely and controversially incorporated into school textbooks during the 20th century. Today, such theories are widely considered to be racist, having been used to justify settler colonalism and white supremacy.

In more recent times, outside of academia a greater variety of speculation of New Zealand's first settlers has occurred. These ideas typically incorporate aspects of conspiracy theories as they are in opposition to the last 100 years of academic research. The common acceptance of these unsubstantiated theories has been used by prominent politicians and public figures to attack Māori politics and culture.

Māori oral traditions 

Māori traditions speak of all manner of spirits, fairy folk, giants, and ogres living in parts of New Zealand when Māori arrived. The pale-skinned  are perhaps the most well-known, which Ngāti Kura, Ngāti Korakorako, and Ngāti Tūrehu are said to be sub-groupings of. In oral tradition,  taught weaving and net-making to the Māori, and could not come out during the day.  were similar in that they could not tolerate sunlight, so they lived in the ocean.

In south Westland, Kāti Māhaki ki Makaawhio's Te Tauraka Waka a Maui Marae is named in honour of a tradition stating that Māui landed his canoe in Bruce Bay when he arrived in New Zealand. In a myth collected from Lake Ellesmere / Te Waihora, Māui threw a giant to the sea and buried him underneath a mountain to create the area around Banks Peninsula.

Kupe and Ngahue were both contemporaries famous for exploring New Zealand before notable migration voyages began. The latter discovered pounamu, the former introduced the first dogs and created Lake Grassmere/Kapara Te Hau to drown Te Kāhui Tipua - who were described as 'giants' or 'ogres' living in Marlborough at the time. Both Kupe and Ngahue returned to Hawaiki, though Ngahue came back with the  after a war with Uenuku.

Other Māori traditions exclude the existence of other humans in New Zealand upon their arrival. A well-known story is how Māui fished up the North Island out of the Pacific Ocean, which Te Rangi Hīroa of Ngāti Mutunga suggests might be a way to say he 'discovered' the island out of the blue, though the rest of the myth is very fanciful in saying parts of his canoe became different areas of both islands.

He brought with him the ancestors of the groups Te Kāhui Tipua, Te Kāhui Roko, and Te Kāhui Waitaha. According to Sir Āpirana Ngata of Ngāti Porou, Rākaihautū did not go south at all, but rather his legend was brought down there. Some accounts may say he is an ancestor of Toi through a daughter that stayed behind in Te Patunuioāio, who himself is an ancestor of Kāti Māmoe, Te Kāhea, Ngāpuhi, Ngāti Rāhiri Tumutumu, and Hāwea in some tellings. Hāwea might have alternatively been a different tribe that arrived on the  before or at a similar time to Waitaha before merging with them, with other ancient tribal groupings possibly including the Maero and Rapuwai.

In Ngāi Tūhoe traditions, Toi's 'ancestor' Tīwakawaka was the first to settle the country aboard , "but only his name is remembered". He sent  back to the new lands with the canoe.

Early European speculation 

During the 19th century, ideas about Aryan  migrations became popular and these were applied to New Zealand. Edward Tregear's The Aryan Maori (1885) suggested that Aryans from India migrated to southeast Asia and thence to the islands of the Pacific, including New Zealand. These ideas were often linked with the hypothesis that Melanesians were the first to occupy the islands of the Pacific Ocean and were later replaced by the Polynesian peoples.

The writing of Percy Smith and Elsdon Best from the late 19th century also theorised about pre-Māori settlement. Their work inspired theories that the Māori had displaced a more primitive pre-Māori population of Moriori, in mainland New Zealand – and that the Chatham Island Moriori were the last remnant of this earlier race. Julius von Haast echoed this idea, suggesting an early nomadic people, who subsisted mainly on moa hunting and beachcombing, were superseded by the Māori who introduced agriculture and lived in small villages.

Starting in the 1920s H. D. Skinner and others overturned this hypothesis by showing the continuation and adaptation of the 'Archaic' Māori culture into the 'Classic' Māori culture. This negated the need for pre-Māori settlement in models of prehistoric New Zealand. Since this time archeology has become a more professional and scientifically rigorous practice and the model of Polynesians arriving in an uninhabited New Zealand and adapting to its environment has not fundamentally changed.

Recent revivals of pre-Māori settlement theories 

Although modern New Zealand archaeology has largely clarified questions of the origin and dates of the earliest migrations, some theorists have continued to speculate that what is now New Zealand was discovered by Melanesians, 'Celts', Greeks, Egyptians or the Chinese, before the arrival of the Polynesian ancestors of the Māori. Some of these ideas have also been supported by politicians and media personalities. For example, Don Brash, formerly leader of the New Zealand National Party, is a high-profile proponent of pre-Māori settlement theories.

An earlier presentation of the theory of pre-Polynesian European settlement of New Zealand was Kerry Bolton's 1987 pamphlet Lords of the Soil, which states that "Polynesia has been occupied by peoples of the Europoid race since ancient times".

Other books presenting such theories have included The Great Divide: The Story of New Zealand & its Treaty, (2012) by Ian Wishart, a journalist, and To the Ends of the Earth by Maxwell C. Hill, Gary Cook and Noel Hilliam, which claims that New Zealand was discovered by explorers from ancient Egypt and Greece.

Historians and archaeologists dismiss the theories. Michael King wrote in his history of New Zealand, "Despite a plethora of amateur theories about Melanesian, South American, Egyptian, Phoenician and Celtic colonisation of New Zealand, there is not a shred of evidence that the first human settlers were anything other than Polynesian", and Richard Hill, professor of New Zealand Studies at Victoria University of Wellington, said in 2012, "Not one of [the theories] has ever passed any remote academic scrutiny." Hugh Laracy of the University of Auckland called them "wild speculation" that has been "thoroughly disposed of by academic specialists".

Another historian, Vincent O'Malley, and the New Zealand Archaeological Association regard the theories as having a racist or at least a political element, seeking to cast doubt on Waitangi Tribunal claims. Scott Hamilton in "No to Nazi Pseudo-history: an Open Letter" further explains objections to the theories of Bolton and Martin Doutré (and the website Ancient Celtic New Zealand).

Ian Wishart, commenting that New Zealand cave art depicting snakes and crocodiles was suggestive of Melanesian cultural memory in early Maori art, nonetheless also criticised those seeking to use pre-Maori settlement to negate treaty obligations: "This is a really important point. It's fascinating academically, but it doesn't matter that modern Maori probably were not the first inhabitants (and in many of their Waitangi claims they actually admit the land was populated by someone else before them). Under international law, finders keepers and the rules of conquest, the first New Zealanders have long since been wiped out or intermarried or become slaves to the later Maori arrivals. Their lands became Maori lands. The Brits were not doing deals with the Patupaiarehe or the Waitaha or the Moriori, they were doing deals with the people who now controlled the land, the Maori."

Claims 

A site frequently related by theorists as evidence of pre-Polynesian settlers is the Kaimanawa Wall, which some claim is a remnant of ancient human construction that the Māori could not have built because they did not build with stone in such a way. Several anthropologists and geologists have concluded the formation to be a natural ignimbrite outcrop formed 330,000 years ago.

Bruce Hayward, a Geological Society spokesman, says the boulders were formed in the ocean 70 million years ago and naturally pushed into the hills over time.

Other supposed structures and creations of pre-Polynesian settlers are described as the Waipoua 'stone city', the 'Waitapu Valley (Maunganui Bluff) solar observatory' including Puketapu hill and a mountain at Hokianga, a 'stone village' in the Tapapakanga Regional Park, and all manner of petroglyphs and carvings found throughout the islands. Most of these ideas are propounded by Doutré.

See also 

 Archaeology of New Zealand
 Māori history
 Moehau
 Natural history of New Zealand
Pseudoarchaeology

References

Sources

 

Pseudohistory
History of New Zealand
Exploration of the Pacific Ocean
Ancient international relations
Medieval international relations
Historical controversies
Conspiracy theories in New Zealand